Beijing Mandarin may refer to:
 Beijing dialect
 Beijing Mandarin (division of Mandarin)